The Holder 17 is an American trailerable sailboat that was designed by Ron Holder as a pocket cruiser and day sailer and first built in 1982.

The boat was developed from the 1976 Vagabond 17 design.

Production
The design was built by Holder Marine and Hobie Cat in the United States, but it is now out of production.

Design
The Holder 17 is a recreational keelboat, built predominantly of fiberglass, with teak wood trim. It has a fractional sloop rig with aluminum spars. The hull has a raked stem, a vertical transom, a transom-hung rudder controlled by a tiller and a locking swing keel. The boat has foam flotation, making it unsinkable.

The boat is normally fitted with a small  outboard motor for docking and maneuvering.

Variants
Holder 17
This cabin model was introduced in 1982.
Holder 17 DS
This day sailing model has only a cuddy cabin for stowage and was introduced in 1982.

Operational history
In a 2010 review, Steve Henkel wrote, "unlike most of Hobie Cat's boats, the Holder 17 is neither a catamaran nor a product of the fertile mind of Hobie Alter, the multibull firm's namesake. It is instead a 'monomaran' from the drawing board of businessman and designer Ron Holder. First came the cabin sloop, in 1981; the next year, a daysailer version was introduced. Best features: The Holder has good sitting headroom compared to her comps. Foam flotation is intended to make her more or less sink-proof. Her relatively heavy swing keel keeps her minimum draft low for easy launching and retrieval at a ramp, while offering good stability with the keel in the 'down' position. With relatively high D/L and low SA/D compared with her comps, she should be stable in heavy air. Worst features: The steel swing keel can be a pain in the neck to keep from rusting."

See also
List of sailing boat types

Related development
Vagabond 17

Similar sailboats
Buzzards Bay 14
Siren 17

References

1980s sailboat type designs
Sailing yachts
Trailer sailers
Keelboats
Sailboat type designs by Ron Holder
Sailboat types built by Holder Marine
Sailboat types built by Hobie Cat